Ogndal is a former municipality in what was the old Nord-Trøndelag county, Norway. The  municipality existed from 1885 until its dissolution in 1964. The municipality included the whole Ogndalen valley and areas to the west, up to, but not including the town of Steinkjer in what is now the central and western part of the municipality of Steinkjer in Trøndelag county. Starting in 1917, the administrative center of Ogndal was actually located in the town of Steinkjer (even though that was not a part of Ogndal municipality).

The main church for Ogndal, Skei Church, is located in the village of Skei in western Ogndal. Another church, Bodom Church, is located in the village of Bodom in the eastern part of the municipality.

History

The municipality of Skei was established on 1 January 1885 when it was separated from the larger municipality of Sparbu. The initial population of Skei was 1,441. On 13 December 1900, the name was changed from Skei to Ogndal, since the municipality encompasses the Ogndalen valley, through which the river Ogna flows.

The municipality of Ogndal bordered the growing town of Steinkjer and as Steinkjer grew, it took over parts of Ogndal. On 1 January 1902, an unpopulated area in western Ogndal was transferred to the town of Steinkjer. In 1941, another small area of Ogndal (population: 57) was transferred to the town of Steinkjer. Again, in 1948, another small area of Ogndal (population: 78) was transferred to Steinkjer.

During the 1960s, there were many municipal mergers across Norway due to the work of the Schei Committee. On 1 January 1964, a large merger took place: the neighboring municipalities of Beitstad (population: 2,563), Egge (population: 3,476), Kvam (population: 1,245), Ogndal (population: 2,678), Sparbu (population: 4,027), and Stod (population: 1,268) were all merged with the town of Steinkjer (population: 4,325) to form the new municipality of Steinkjer.

Name
The municipality was originally (from 1885 until 1900) named after the old Skei farm since the first Skei Church was built there. In December 1900, the name was changed to Ogndal, after the Ogndalen valley in which the municipality is located. The first element comes from the name of the local river Ogna. It is the genitive case of the word  which means "fear" or "the terrifying".

Government
While it existed, this municipality was responsible for primary education (through 10th grade), outpatient health services, senior citizen services, unemployment, social services, zoning, economic development, and municipal roads. During its existence, this municipality was governed by a municipal council of elected representatives, which in turn elected a mayor.

Mayors
The mayors of Ogndal:

 1885–1891: Benjamin Ryan 
 1892–1893: Sakarias Støen 
 1894–1897: Johan Kristian Schiefloe
 1898-1898: Oluf Anton Schult
 1899–1910: Christian Overrein
 1911–1913: Rafael Bolaas (LL)
 1914–1916: Edvard Røysing (LL)
 1917–1919: Bertin Kjesbu (LL)
 1920–1922: Nikolay Norstrøm (LL)
 1923–1925: Bertin Kjesbu (Bp)
 1926–1927: Nikolay Norstrøm (Bp)
 1927–1928: Arne Kjesbu (Bp)
 1929–1931: Bertin Kjesbu (Bp)
 1932–1937: Arne Kjesbu (Bp)
 1938–1941: Axel Stigum (Ap)
 1942–1945: Arnfinn Benum (NS)
 1945-1945: Axel Stigum (Ap)
 1946–1947: Andreas Bruem (Bp)
 1948–1951: Alf Øye (Bp)
 1952–1955: Axel Stigum (Ap)
 1956–1963: Johan Mathisen (Ap)
 1963-|963: Reidar Johansen (Ap)

Municipal council
The municipal council  of Ogndal was made up of representatives that were elected to four year terms. The party breakdown of the final municipal council was as follows:

See also
List of former municipalities of Norway

References

Steinkjer
Former municipalities of Norway
1885 establishments in Norway
1964 disestablishments in Norway